The Cantonal Council of Obwalden is the legislature of the canton of Obwalden, in Switzerland.  Obwalden has a unicameral legislature.  The Cantonal Council has 55 seats, with members elected every four years.

In the last election, on 7 March 2010, saw the center maintain its dominance of the Cantonal Council.  The Christian Democrats lost three seats, but remained the largest party with 20.  The Swiss People's Party gained five seats to the become the second largest party, while the FDP.The Liberals retained 10 seats but dropped to the third largest.  The Social Democratic Party remained steady with 6 seats and the Christian Social Party lost two seats to have 8.

|-
! style="background-color:#E9E9E9;text-align:left;" colspan=2 |Party
! style="background-color:#E9E9E9;text-align:left;" width=150px |Ideology
! style="background-color:#E9E9E9;text-align:right;" width=50px |Vote %
! style="background-color:#E9E9E9;text-align:right;" width=50px |Vote % ±
! style="background-color:#E9E9E9;text-align:right;" width=50px |Seats
! style="background-color:#E9E9E9;text-align:right;" width=50px |Seats ±
|-
| style="background-color: " |
| style="text-align:left;" | Christian Democratic People's Party
| style="text-align:left;" | Christian democracy
| style="text-align:right;" | 33.82
| style="text-align:right;" | –1.2
| style="text-align:right;" | 20
| style="text-align:right;" | -3
|-
| style="background-color: " |
| style="text-align:left;" | Social Democratic Party
| style="text-align:left;" | Social democracy
| style="text-align:right;" | 21.92
| style="text-align:right;" | –0.9
| style="text-align:right;" | 11
| style="text-align:right;" | +5
|-
| style="background-color: " |
| style="text-align:left;" | FDP.The Liberals
| style="text-align:left;" | Classical liberalism
| style="text-align:right;" | 17.91
| style="text-align:right;" | +1.9
| style="text-align:right;" | 10
| style="text-align:right;" | ±0
|-
| width=5px style="background-color: " |
| style="text-align:left;" | Swiss People's Party
| style="text-align:left;" | National conservatism
| style="text-align:right;" | 10.95
| style="text-align:right;" | -1.05
| style="text-align:right;" | 6
| style="text-align:right;" | ±0
|-
| style="background-color: #d72e13" |
| style="text-align:left;" | Christian Social Party
| style="text-align:left;" | Christian democracy
| style="text-align:right;" | 15.41
| style="text-align:right;" | +1.4
| style="text-align:right;" | 8
| style="text-align:right;" | -2
|- style="background: #E9E9E9"
! style="text-align:left;" colspan=3| Total
| style="text-align:right;" |  100.00
| style="text-align:right;" |  –
| 55
| style="text-align:right;" | –
|-
| colspan=8 style="text-align:left;" | Source: Canton of Obwalden
|}

References

Obwalden
Obwalden
Obwalden